Ooi Hoe Guan (born 31 December 1973) is a former Malaysian footballer. He also used to be a member of the Malaysia national football team.

Hoe Guan began his career with Kedah FA youth team. He transferred to Penang FA and started his senior debut in the Malaysia league,  where he committed with Penang for more 7 seasons before returning to Kedah to become rotation squad player. After a couple of seasons with the hometown side, Guan called it quits and retired from football.

International Senior Goals

Honours

Penang FA
 Malaysia Premier 1 League: 1998, 2001 
 Malaysia FA Cup: 2002

References

External links
 

1973 births
Living people
Malaysian footballers
Malaysia international footballers
Malaysian sportspeople of Chinese descent
Penang F.C. players
Kedah Darul Aman F.C. players
People from Kedah
Association football wingers
Association football forwards